There are more than 100 distinct ethnic groups and tribes in Tanzania, not including ethnic groups that reside in Tanzania as refugees from conflicts in nearby countries. These ethnic groups are of Bantu origin, with large Nilotic-speaking, moderate indigenous, and small non-African minorities. The country lacks a clear dominant ethnic majority: the largest ethnic group in Tanzania, the Maasai, comprises only about 16 percent of the country's total population, followed by the Wanyakyusa and the Chagga. Unlike its neighbouring countries, Tanzania has not experienced large-scale ethnic conflicts, a fact attributed to the unifying influence of the Swahili language.

The ethnic groups mentioned here are mostly differentiated based on ethnolinguistic lines. They may sometimes be referred to together with noun class prefixes appropriate for ethnonyms: this can be either a prefix from the ethnic group's native language (if Bantu), or the Swahili prefix wa.

 

Immigrant groups:

References

Ndwewe ; from morogoro, Tanzania. Malinyi, ulanga and Kilombero
Ethnologue
Ethnic groups of Tanzania

Tanzania
Ethni